Waldstatt railway station is a railway station in the municipality of Waldstatt, in the Swiss canton of Appenzell Ausserrhoden. It is located on the  Gossau–Wasserauen line of Appenzell Railways.

History 
The station opened in 1925. In 2020, Appenzell Railways completed a  renovation of the station. Improvements were made to the digital signage, platforms, and disabled access.

Services 
 the following services stop at Waldstatt:

References

External links 
 
 

Railway stations in the canton of Appenzell Ausserrhoden
Appenzell Railways stations
Railway stations in Switzerland opened in 1925